Three ships have borne the name SS Indiana. They are:

 - a steamship built in 1848 by F.M. Keating.
 - a passenger steamship launched in 1873 by William Cramp & Sons for the American Line.
 - a passenger ship launched by Societa Esercizio Bacini in 1905 for Lloyd Italiano.

Ship names